The first Russian circumnavigation of the Earth took place from August 1803 to August 1806 and was carried out on two ships, the Nadezhda and the Neva, under the commands of Adam Johann von Krusenstern and Yuri Lisyansky, respectively. The expedition had complementary economic, diplomatic, and exploratory goals. 

The main aim was to establish diplomatic and economic relations between Russia and Japan and with Chinese ports for trading Russian furs. The Chinese stage of the expedition was tied to the overland embassy headed by Yury Golovkin. To help establish diplomatic and economic relations between Russia and Japan, the party included a large diplomatic delegation headed by the Court Chamberlain and plenipotentiary ambassador Nikolai Rezanov. Rezanov was also the "High Representative" of the Russian-American Company. However, Rezanov frequently conflicted with Krusenstern, who had spent years proposing the round-the-world expedition and had different priorities.

The ships set off from Kronstadt on August 7, stopping at Copenhagen, Falmouth, Tenerife, Brazil, Nuku Hiva, and Hawaii. When the expedition reached the Hawaiian Islands in June 1804 the vessels parted ways – the Nadezhda went to Kamchatka and Japan, while the Neva headed to Kodiak Island, Alaska, where it spent 14 months and participated in the Russian-Tlingit war. The ships were reunited in Guangzhou in December 1805, and after leaving China, they sailed together for a short time, before returning independently to Kronstadt in August 1806.

From the political perspective, the expedition was unsuccessful since Japanese authorities did not allow the envoy to enter the country and refused to establish diplomatic relations. In 1805, Rezanov and his retinue were landed in Kamchatka and later started to act independently.

The expedition made several discoveries in the Pacific, naming and describing islands, archipelagos, capes, reefs, and straits. In addition, botanical, zoological, and ethnographical information was collected. Many of the people who took part in the expedition published books recounting their travels in multiple languages, while other diaries were not published until the 21st century.

Background

According to the historian , "we can only be surprised that the first voyage around the world was carried out only in the 19th century, although we had already had all the necessary prerequisites in the 18th century". The first project to reach Kamchatka by sea from Kronstadt was submitted by Fedor Soimonov during the rule of Peter the Great in 1722. In reaction to Vitus Bering's second expedition, in 1732, vice admiral  suggested that Empress Anna send two frigates with an annual supply of provisions to Kamchatka through the Cape of Good Hope. However, the decline of the Russian Navy from the 1730s to the 1760s delayed large-scale plans. In 1780s, the growing activity of the Great Britain, France, and the United States in the North Pacific threatened Russian interests in expanding in the Far East – particularly, the Aleutian Islands where the Chukchi people defended their independence by force. At that time, territorial claims could be justified with full and original cartographic data. However, it turned out that Russians did not describe a large part of Alaska that was present on James Cook's maps. In order to secure Russian interests in the region, in 1785–1794, Joseph Billings led an expedition to explore the Northeast Passage. Crucial to the planning and successful implementation of this expedition was the Russian navigator Gavril Sarychev. Departure of the expedition was significantly accelerated by the news that Jean-François de Galaup had set sail for the first voyage around the world.

On December 22, 1786, Catherine the Great signed the order directing the Admiralty Board to send maritime forces of the Baltic fleet to Kamchatka through the Cape of Good Hope and Sunda Strait. The 1st rank captain  headed the squadron, and in April 1787, the Admiralty board sent him his orders. According to the document, Mulovsky had to describe all Kuril islands, to go around Sakhalin and then, after getting to the Nootka Island, to annex to Russia "all banks to the starting point of Aleksei Chirikov's discoveries". Russian claims should be "established" with the cast-iron pillars with the state emblem on them, as well as with 1,700 medals for distribution among the indigenous population. Mulovsky would not have to return across the world; his ships were to remain in the Far East and in the Russian America. In the spring of 1787, James Trevenen submitted to the empress his project on developing the fur trade in the Pacific. Trevenen's plan implied sending three ships from Kronstadt to Cape Horn; two ships were supposed to stay in Kamchatka while the last one would deliver furs to China and to Japan. Later, Trevenen was appointed by the empress as a captain of the 2nd rank in Russia. Due to the start of the  Russo-Turkish and Russo-Swedish wars, the circumnavigation expedition was cancelled. Mulovsky and Trevenen both later died in separate naval battles.

Between 1780 and 1783, the merchant Grigory Shelikhov tried three times to interest top government officials to send merchant ships from the Baltic sea to Russian America. By 1785, he reached admiral  and even Tsar Paul I. However, supplies continued to be delivered through Siberian region and the city of Okhotsk. According to some evidence, in 1791–1802, the rich merchant Thorkler from Reval carried out several round-the-world and half-round-the world expeditions on his foreign (particularly, French) ships. Among the other places, he visited Petropavlovsk-Kamchatsky, Nootka Island, Canton, and Kolkata. Judging by the correspondence between Thorkler and count Nikolay Rumyantsev, the former played a significant role in lobbying for Adam Johann von Krusenstern's expedition and in organizing his new voyage to Kolkata and Canton in 1805–1807. Thus, the archival documents, the "Overview of the Russian-American company" (1819), and periodical press of the beginning of the 19th century refute the belief established in historiography that, before Krusenstern's trip, no Russian ships crossed the equator.

Krusenstern began to serve under the command of Mulovsky and, probably, was familiar with his plans. Later he, together with Lisyansky and Yakov Bering (grandson of the famous explorer Vitus Bering), went to the six-year expedition with  the British merchant fleet. In 1793–1799 Krusenstern, Lisyansky and Bering carried out long trips to North and South America, India, and China. During one of his trips to the US, Krusenstern even met George Washington who organized a special reception for the travellers.  In 1799 Krusenstern sent to statesman  the  project where he emphasized the importance of the new plan on supplying Russian America and on trading fur with China. Later this year, Irkutsk Governor  also submitted his plan on establishing diplomatic and trading relations with Japan. However, due to the war with France, none of the projects were implemented.

Plan and equipment

Krusenstern's project and the report of the Russian-American company

After his failure in 1799–1800 to interest the government in sponsoring the expedition, Krusenstern spent three years in his Estland' estate where he settled down to married life. A new opportunity to promote his project appeared during the rule of Alexander I. Krusenstern submitted his plan when the Russian government urgently needed money due to its participation in the second and the third anti-French coalitions. Not surprisingly that in 1802 founders of the committee for the formation of the fleet Alexander Vorontsov and rear admiral Pavel Chichagov objected against implementing the plan since development of the ground forces should be prioritized.

The essence of the project remained the same. The Krusenstern's manuscript of 25 pages was dated January 1, 1802. It got to Nikolay Mordvinov who served as a vice-president of the Admiralty Board at the time when the project to launch the Kamchatka marine expedition was developing. Krusenstern put in the first place the Russian commercial interests, "from which the country was excluded out of its neglect." Thus, he suggested the all-round state support for the large private enterprises to develop shipping in the Pacific, relying on ports in Northwest America and Kamchatka. That would allow reducing the positions of England and the United States in the fur trade while strengthening the Russian role on the Chinese and Japanese' markets. The goods received in the Far East would be delivered to Saint Petersburg by sea and not through Kyakhta as it was before. In a long-term perspective, that would grant the Russian Empire access to Southeast Asian and Indian markets, and even creation of the Russian East India Company. On July 26, 1802, Alexander I personally approved the project, allowing Krusenstern to implement it by his own.

In Summer 1802, Minister of Commerce Nikolay Rumyantsev and Nikolai Rezanov, on behalf of the Mainboard of the Russian-American Company, submitted a very similar project, in which they referred to the notes of Krusenstern from 1799. The plan by Rumyantsev and Resanov was submitted as the "most genuine statement" on July 29, 1802. The project aimed to deliver in Russian America all the required goods, to free the citizens of the Yakutsk region from the heavy traffic, to strengthen Russian positions in the Pacific, to start trading in China. By referencing to Krusenstern, it was suggested to populate the Urup island and to start trade with Japan through the mediation of indigenous people Ainu. To finance the expedition, they requested a loan from the State borrowing bank for 250,000 rubles for eight years at 2% per annum. It was also suggested to award title to a merchant Alexander Baranov.

Travel plans and the chief of the expedition

The government approved the project suggested by the Russian-American Company (RAC). Even though Krusenstern claimed that he was immediately appointed as a "commander of the two ships", in reality, appointing a commander proved to be a much more complicated process. Yuri Lisyansky wrote to Krusenstern on April 17, 1802, that the vice-president Mordvinov inquired him about Krusenstern' personal qualities. However, the RAC's directorate first appointed an English skipper Makmeister and later Lisyansky.. Only when the count Rumyantsev interfered on August 7, 1802, Krusenstern was officially designated as the head of the first Russian circumnavigation. On August 21 Lisyansky was also recruited to the RAC. By that time, the expedition was in danger – by July 1802 RAC was on the verge of bankruptcy and was able to sponsor only one ship. For this reason, the directorate agreed that the state would fully assert all necessary equipment and maintenance of the second vessel. Therefore, it was necessary to solve all juridical issues and to make decisions about the flag under which the expedition would be carried out. According to the Krusenstern's petition from July 3, 1803, and Rumyantsev's report on the Highest Name from October 12, 1805, the expedition used both military and commercial flags depending on the context. However, the RAC's flag was approved only after the end of the expedition and for this reason the sloop Nadezhda under the command of Krusenstern primarily used St. Andrew's flag while the Neva used the national flag.

The main aims of the expedition were political: to explore the mouth of Amur river and adjacent areas to find convenient roots and ports for the Russian Pacific fleet. The second most important task was to "establish trading roots on the way to America and back", meaning transferring commercial cargo to Alaska, and on the way back establishing trading relations with Japan and Canton. For awarding Russian settlers and natives, the expedition was granted with 325 medals that were left after the emperor's coronation. Lisyansky embraced coinage of medals "for the elders of the North American tribes" with the inscription "Russian Unioners" only after the expedition returned home. In the report from February 20, 1803, for the first time the idea was expressed to "appoint someone to the Japanese embassy", which should have been headed by Rezanov. In April Rezanov wrote to Ivan Dmitriev that they gradually managed to persuade the emperor to approve the plan, which was later officially approved on June 10, 1803. At that time, relations between Krusenstern and Rezanov were neutral, and the captain even started to distribute the RAC' shares among his friend to increase the expedition' finances. The RAC's "instruction" to captain Krusenstern on May 29, 1803, stated that he was the "main commander" with the embassy mission with all the officials on his ship. The only people who were subordinated to Rezanov were company clerks reaching Canton. Before the departure, both sloops were equipped with food and all the necessities for the next two years, as well as granted with promised salaries. The crew and officers of the Nadezhda were employees of the Imperial Navy, while those who served on the Neva subordinated to the RAC.

Rezanov was not a professional diplomat. He started his court service as the head of the Derzhavin's office back in the reign of Catherine II. On July 10, 1803, Rezanov received the rank of a real chamberlain of the court and the order of St. Anne, 1st degree. Before that, on June 26, he was elected as an honorary member of the Academy of Science  in connection with his departure to the scientific expedition.  Through connections with the Ministry of Foreign Affairs, he received the status of a diplomatic agent of the second rank –  Extraordinary Envoy and Minister Plenipotentiary. Judging by a data from indirect pieces of evidence, Rezanov participated in a conspiracy against Platon Zubov and Peter Ludwig von der Pahlen, from which the new emperor Alexander was trying to get rid of. The decline of Derzhavin's career also played a role in turning the Rezanov's fate. According to some of the historians, his appointment to Japan and Russian colonies in America was a type of exile, and not that honorary. Also, Rezanov received incorrectly given instructions, and for this reason, his later conflict with Krusenstern and military officers was unavoidable.

According to the RAC's instruction from July 10, 1803, and the Rumyantsev's letter to Rezanov from May 28, 1803, the expedition was supposed to get to Kamchatka and Alaska, and round Cape Horn through Cape Verde and port Valparaíso in Chile. On the way back, ships were supposed to visit Canton, South Asian and Indian ports, to establish trading relations. Lisyansky who led Neva should have explored the Bering Strait and the North-Western way. At the very last minute on June 18, 1803, baron J. K. Odeleben submitted his project on heading the expedition to Africa to organize the resettlement of black people to the Far Eastern parts of Russia as free colonists. The plan was rejected as being "non-performing".

Minister of Foreign Affairs Chancellor Alexander Vorontsov ordered the Russian embassies in England, Spain, the Netherlands, Portugal, France to ask local governments to help the expedition. For instance, the British consulate in St. Petersburg allowed the expedition to freely act in any of the British lands. The final plan of the journey, that was approved by the RAC's directorate, was the following: two sloops were supposed to get to Hawaiian islands through Cape Horn, where Lisyansky would lead Neva to the Russian America while Nadezhda under the command of Krusenstern would get to Japan. After spending the winter on Kamchatka or Kodiak island, the sloops were to be reunited and headed to Canton for trading furs. The return route Krusenstern could choose by himself.

Expedition and purchase of vessels

It is still unclear why the RAC's directorate made a decision to charter or buy expeditionary vessels abroad. Judging by the correspondence between the Department of the Navy and the Collegium of Commerce in 1800–1801, the Russian navy had about 10 vessels of the right size, not counting cargo ships. Moreover, in one of his letters Rezanov mentioned that shipbuilder  was ready to build a vessel of any size specifically for the round-the-world voyage. However, the directorate decided to buy ships abroad and sent Lisyansky to complete the task.

On September 24, 1802, Lisyansky and shipbuilder  left for Hamburg where they could not find the required vessels. Then they arrived to England where they bought two sloops: the 16-gun 450-ton Leander which was later renamed to Nadezhda, and the 14-gun 370-ton Thames which later became the Neva. Some of the expedition officers claimed that Lisyansky conspired with the seller and embezzled the money by buying old ships for the price of new ones. Nadezhda was built around 1795 and at one time had been captured by France. Its foremast was damaged by canister shot and many pieces of the hull were rotten. Neva was somewhat better-suited for a circumnavigation (it had even sailed to India), but its rigging needed to be replaced.

They decided not to perform the repairs in Kronstadt so that Lisyansky would not be suspended from the voyage. As a result, the foremast and the main mast (whose wood had cracked, causing rotting of the mast core and step) were replaced in Brazil at the expanse of the RAC, even though they had already spent £5000 on initial repairs in England. Krusenstern claimed that both vessels cost around £, but, according to the Ministry of Foreign Affairs, the cost was £. In 2018 prices, this corresponds to on the order £–. According to the History of the Russian-American Company, Nadezhda cost  silver rubles and Neva cost  silver rubles. Lisyansky calculated that the overall expedition budget was around  assignation rubles, including £ ( rubles) for both vessels. In addition, an extra sum of  Mexican dollars was allocated to maintain Rezanov's retinue.

The unsuitability of sloops became obvious after their arrival to Kronstadt on June 5, 1803. Judging by the notes of the Nevas navigator Kalinin and the correspondence between Rumyantsev, Rezanov, Krusenstern, and the directors of the RAC, Nadezhda was in a particularly deplorable state. In stormy weather, its hull was constantly leaking and at threat of flooding. Upon arrival to Kamchatka, the expedition leadership even started discussing a plan to abandon the vessel.

Expedition personnel

According to the official documentation, 129 people were on board the two vessels, 84 of them served on Nadezhda. Besides officers, non-commissioned officers, and seamen, in the expedition took part: ambassador Rezanov's retinue with service personnel, RAC officers, and five Japanese survivors of the Wakamiya-maru wreck returning to their homeland. Initially, officers took leave from the military and signed contracts with the RAC. Five officers and non-commissioned officers got their next ranks during the expedition. Their contracts implied only tasks that were directly related to commerce, but officers never took part in trade themselves. Krusenstern wrote that even though he was advised to hire foreign seamen, he decided to take volunteers from Russia for whom he procured a salary in 120 rubles. There was also a semi-anecdotal case: Tatar sailor Abdul Abuzarov, while being already recruited to the team, later married Estonian girl just four months before the departure, and, according to Krusenstern, "fell into deep thoughtfulness". In the end, the directorate decided to leave him in Russia.

In the description of the trip, both Krusenstern and Lisyansky listed all the members of their teams by names. Most of the officers and passengers were very young, the oldest crew members were 42-year old doctor  and 39-year old Rezanov By the time of the expedition, Krusenstern turned 33 years old. The youngest crew members were 13 and 15-year old cadets  and Otto von Kotzebue who got accepted because of the request of their father whose wife was a cousin of Krusenstern.  who got a 13-years of combat experience participated in naval battles with Fyodor Ushakov, was appointed as a first assistant. Lieutenant Levenstern also had experience in the fighting, as did the captain, who had six years of service in the British Navy. Lieutenant Romberg served under the command of Krusenstern on the frigate "Narva". Michman Fabian Gottlieb von Bellingshausen proved to be an excellent cartographer and was promoted to a lieutenant. The ambassador's retinue also included random people, in particular, Count Fedor Tolstoy. On the Neva there were hieromonk Gideon (Fedotov) from the Alexander Nevsky Lavra and clerk Nikolai Korobitsyn from the RAC, who were included in the retinue of the ambassador. Korobitsyn was to watch for Lisyansky and to give him money for any ship related costs, including salaries to officers. This did not anyhow related to the maritime charter.

Both commanders differed in their way of communicating with the crews. For instance, Krusenstern thought that the team needs to be treated softly, and for that, he was criticized by Levenstern. Lisyansky, on the contrary, introduced severe discipline on the Neva and actively used corporal punishment. Priest Gideon even spoke unsightly about him since Lisyansky neglected the faith and even banned worship on the ship  and michman Berh, and that, probably, led to his resignation after their arrival. In addition, Lisyansky often violated instruction of the "Admiralty college" and acted separately from Nadezhda. Lieutenants Ratmanov and Romberg were not alien to culture, knew the French language and even corresponded with Nikolay Karamzin. When playing music in the mess, Romberg was the first violin in the ship's orchestra, while Ratmanov was reading books on travels and on philosophy even during shifts, and got annoyed if others distracted him.

Even though the RAC did not have any scientific aims, Krusenstern addressed the Russian Academy of Science (where he was elected as a corresponding member on April 25, 1803) and created the "scientific committee". Based on the recommendation of Austrian astronomer Franz Xaver von Zach, the directorate hired Swiss musician Johann Caspar Horner who played the flute brilliantly, and had a desperate courage: in order to deliver Chinese skull to famous phrenologist Franz Joseph Gall, he stole the head of the executed in Macau. Botanist and zoologist Wilhelm Gottlieb Tilesius von Tilenau was the main painter of the expedition. Even though von Tilenau called himself a dilettant, he probably attended Adam Friedrich Oeser' classes in Leipzig. Doctor of medicine Georg von Langsdorff, after finding out about the expedition, went to Copenhagen personally and asked Krusenstern and Rezanov to accept him in the crew. He landed with Rezanov in Kamchatka and headed to Russian America. Karl Espenberg was a doctor on the Nadezhda, before that he graduated from the University of Jena, and later served as a family doctor in Krusenstern's family starting from 1797. Doctor on the Neva Moritz Laband was originally from Silesia and probably of Jewish origin; he graduated from the Martin Luther University of Halle-Wittenberg.

The expedition had a problem with ethnocultural and language barriers. Others were ethnic Germans with different linguistic dialects. For instance, Langsdorf was from Swabia; Tilesius from Thuringia; Horner from Switzerland; Robberg from Grand Duchy of Finland; Krusenstern, Levenstern, Espenberg, Bellingshausen, Kotzebue – Baltic Germans. At the beginning of the voyage, scientists did not know Russian, while not every officer and members of the retinue knew German. According to the Levenstern' diaries, German "dominated the messes"; if necessary, the crew could switch to English or French; communication with the team was in Russian. Judging by his diary, Levenstern "sometimes didn't even notice what language was he using." For instance, he could write German or English words in Cyrillic or the Russian ones in Latin. Botanist Brinkin (whose second name was written in German as "Brincken", but merchant Shemelin called him "Brykin") graduated from the medical-surgery academy and knew Latin so well that he even tried to pursue naturalist in the crew to communicate on it. However, Langsdorf and Tilezious did not accept him to their company. They also did not get along between themselves because Tilezious always tried to subdue Langsdorf.

Living conditions
Due to significant congestion of commercial cargos and people, the expedition vessels were largely deprived of freshwater storages and provisions. The crews consumed crackers and corned beef, the quality of which Krusenstern explicitly emphasized and even provided the names of the supplier, on a daily dietary basis. Moreover, they ate sauerkraut and cranberry juice as a matter of protection against scurvy. Uniforms, linen and beddings designed for different latitudes were made in England. Generally, living conditions were quite extreme: even officers and members of the retinue had such small cabins that they could use them only for sleeping. The only places where people could conduct research, draw maps or write diaries were the messes. On Nadezhda around twenty people constantly socialized in there, while on Neva – only ten. Even two senior officials Krusenstern and Rezanov huddled in captain's' cabins which were around 6 m2 with no basic household amenities: no heating, ventilation or a good lighting. For the 84 people, there were only 3 latrines. According to the diaries of lieutenant Levenstern, one of the RAC's clerk even had to settle in one of the cargo boxes instead of a cabin. The constant shortage of freshwater made washing very difficult. In addition, the crews had to keep animals (including a cow with a calf) and birds for replenishing the diet. Pigs were once washed in the waters of the Atlantic Ocean. Under these conditions, members of the embassy retinue, who did not have any regular occupations, mired in conflicts and gambling. On the contrary, all the officers had the hardest time since they had to keep watches and make weather observations. Besides, their duties also implied writing travel journals, supervising and training the crews. Observations could take a minimum of three hours per day, and one hour for filling the journal up. Overall, the lieutenants had three shifts – two 3-hour day shifts, and a 4-hour night shift. As a result, many experienced nervous breakdowns. For instance, while staying on the island Nuku-Hiva, artist Kurlyandov grabbed an axe and smashed his entire cabin, not even sparing the icons.

Scientific equipment

According to historian Elena Govor, participants of the first Russian circumnavigation thought of themselves as heirs of James Cook and Lapérouse. Lieutenant Romberg compared the trip from Falmouth to Tenerife with the Laperouse's voyage from Brest to Madeira. Ratmanov expressed similar thoughts right after their arrival to Santa Catarina Island and explicitly mentioned that they anchored at the French parking lot. On Kamchatka, Ratmanov installed a new tombstone to Cook's comrade-in-arms Charles Clerke, whose burial place was initially identified by Lapérouse. Lisyansky's companions even visited Kealakekua Bay, where James Cook was killed.

The Saint Petersburg Academy of Sciences provided instructions for scientists taking part in the expedition. For example, Vasily Severgin compiled specific manual for studying minerals and "Theory of the Earth" that was published in 1804 in the "". Scientist  compiled instructions on botany, while academician  worked on set of instructions on zoology. Sevastyanov's instruction identified four geographical regions that present a special interest from the natural history point of view, including geographies of Japan and Kamchatka. He also mentioned a status and a role of a scientist in commercial enterprise, providing the examples of Carl Peter Thunberg and father and son Johann Reinhold Forster and George Foster. In total, Sevastyanov provided 14 basic procedures for conducting observations including an obligatory indication of the exact date of sample conducting and their classifications according to binomial nomenclature. He also mentioned a necessity to sketch the appearances and to conserve conducted samples for subsequent transfer to the Imperial Cabinet of the Russian Empire. However, Langsdorf ignored the last point, and the majority of the collected samples got to the Natural History Museum in Berlin.

Besides, on June 13, 1803, Commerce Minister Count Rumyantsev suggested to Krusenstern finding and exploring Hashima Island allegedly seen by Dutch and Spanish sailors. To define geographic coordinates, Krusenstern and astronomer Horner constantly checked Chronometer watch. They also tried to fix the meteorological data regularly, but, taking into consideration the situation on the ship and general lack of scientific aims, they did not conduct night observations; and could have taken breaks from conducting data for a day or more. Moreover, ship rolling changed chronometer data significantly and later in Japan, the apparatus broke. Temperature on Nadezhda was measured in Réaumur scale, on Neva – in Fahrenheit. According to Yuly Shokalsky 's assessment, it was the first time during the expedition when vertical assessments of deep-ocean temperatures were measured. Measurements were carried out via the so-called "Galsov's machine" which was practically just a primitive bathometer in the form of a copper cylinder with valves, inside of which there was a mercury thermometer. Systematic observations were only possible on the time of stop in Nagasaki from October 11, 1804, to April 17, 1805. Krusenstern personally measured temperature, pressure, humidity, atmospheric transparency, direction, strength and duration of the wind, thunderstorms, clouds, fogs, dew and other meteorological phenomena at 8 am, 4 pm and 8 pm.

Nadezhda had a library with personal book collections of officers and scientists. All books that were on the voyage (around 48) have Krusenstern's note "Nadezhda, 1803–1806". Besides atlases and maps (15 different authors including James Cook, Louis Antoine de Bougainville, Aaron Arrowsmith, and others), nautical plans, works on astronomy and mathematics, descriptions of travels that worked as sailing directions. Krusenstern thought that Antoine François Prévost 's publication "Mémoires et aventures d 'un homme de qualité qui s'est retiré du monde" was so important that later he even passed it to Kotzebue, thus the book travelled around the world twice.

Expedition

From Kronstadt to Brazil (August - December 1803)

Baltic sea

Expedition vessels arrived in Kronstadt on June 5, 1803. Krusenstern immediately examined them and concluded that on the Nadezhda the entire rigging and two masts need to be replaced: while loading, the ship almost turned over. Thanks to port captain Myasoedov and his assistant Bychinsky, all necessary repairs had been carried out within the shortest time possible. Only on July 06, the expedition went to the Kronstadt raid where the emperor Alexander I observed both vessels from his personal sloop. However, due to nasty winds and a constantly increasing amount of cargos, the departure was significantly delayed. On August 2, Minister Rumyantsev visited both vessels and ordered to get rid of any unnecessary cargos during the later stop in Copenhagen. Moreover, five people from Rezanov's retinue were suspended from travel On the same day, sailman Zahar Usov fell overboard and drowned in the Neva river. The expedition departed at 10 am on August 7. But then wind direction changed again, and both sloops had to cruise around Gotland until August 10, and passed Revel only late at night. Due to extreme convergence of people, the commander had to set up the schedule for shifts, and norms of provision. People were allowed to receive a pound of beef and a pound of crackers per day, as well as a cup of vodka (for those who did not drink, there was a premium of 9 cents per cup) and a pound of oil per week. For each meal, there was only one main dish. For lunch – shchi with corned beef, made from the sour cabbage, or fish. During the holidays, the crews usually got some fresh meat. For dinner both crews usually got porridge with butter.

On half-past five on August 17, the expedition reached Copenhagen where the vessels had to be reloaded: take on board the scientistic team and load some French cognac ("Burdov vodka") for the Russian-American company. Due to satisfactory barometric readings, the sloops were ready for a squall on August 19: the crews lowered the yards and topmasts in advance. However, after the vessels reached the port on August 20, they had to stay there for a long time because almost all the provision had to be replaced: all crackers and corned beef needed to be re-dry, re-pour and re-pack in the new barrels. Sour cabbage was almost fully spoiled. The whole process of re-settling accompanied with intense correspondence with St. Petersburg. The long stay in the Danish capital led to the first conflicts between Krusenstern and Rezanov. According to diaries by Levenstern and Ratmanov, the ambassador and his court advisor Fosse regularly attended brothels without taking away their regales and orders. Count Tolstoy even got an "illness which is characteristic for his age".

From August 21 to September 4, a reconciliation of ship chronometers was carried out at the Copenhagen Observatory. Only at 5 pm on September 08, the vessels went to the sea again. However, a storm from the northwest kept the sloops in Helsingør for the next six days. During the three-week stay, both crews daily consumed fresh meat and green, as well as two pints of beer that generally cost 400 piastres (Mexican dollars), at the rate of 1 ruble 90 kopecks per piastre.

The UK and Canary Islands

Due to intense storms nearby  Skagerrak, the sloops parted, and weather stabilized only by September 20. Fishing on Dogger Bank turned out to be unsuccessful; thus, Kruzenshtern decided to test the "Galsov's machine" (bathometer). However, the sea depth was only 24 fathoms and a difference between the water temperature at the surface and at the bottom was negligible. On September 23, Krusenstern met the English vessel "Lavergin" the commander of which Beresdorf was his longtime colleague. Beresdorf took Rezanov and astronomer Horner on board to deliver them to London where they had some businesses. That allowed to save some time, plus, Krusenstern sent his nephew Bistrom ashore since his health suddenly worsened. In London Rezanov and his companion  met count Semyon Vorontsov, went sightseeing, and then returned to Nadezhda through the cities of Bath and Bristol.

On September 27, Nadezhda reached Falmouth where the Neva was waiting for her for two days. It was decided to stock up on Irish corned beef, out of fear that the one delivered from Hamburg could not stand even a year's journey. Both vessels heavily leaked; thus Krusenstern hired eight caulkers, who worked for six days. Also, they had to deliver fresh water from more than 4 miles away. According to Korobitsyn' calculations, both supplies and water cost around 1170 piastres. Additionally, Nevas upper deck was caulked, and rotten boards on the tank were replaced. For that, Lisyansky was issued with other 1,159 piastres. Nevertheless, lower decks and holds of both of the ships were damp, condensation accumulated even in the messes. To prevent it, even in good weather, the crews opened hatches and ventilated the premises. In addition, they filled the braziers with burning coals, as well as used vinegar and burning sulfur. After getting to the sea, Lisyansky insisted that sailors get washed twice a week, and every incoming shift in tropical latitudes was necessarily poured by the sea water.

The departure was late only because Rezanov was not returning from London. He went on board on October 5, and at the very same day the vessels headed to the Canary Islands. A rapid transition to subtropical climate was very noticeable – on October 8 the temperature increased to 14 °R (17,5 °C). On October 10 the crews observed a significant bolide in the constellation of Sagittarius. Because the sea was calm on October 13, Horner and Langsdorf carried out oceanographic measurements and lowered the bathometer to 95 fathoms. On October 19 they reached Tenerife where they met French privateer that was passing by between Nadezhda and Neva. The vessels followed the raid Santa Cruz de Tenerife at 11 am on October 20; because of the rocky bottom of the sea, the Neva lost verp and two cable length.

Since acquiring the necessary supplies was complicated, the expedition stayed in Tenerife until October 27. The crews bought fresh vegetables and fruits, potatoes and pumpkins, as well as four buttles of Canarian wine. In total, it cost 1200 piastres. During that time, Rezanov stayed with merchant Armstrong, and Horner stayed with the governor of the island, taking chronometers and observational instruments with him. The observatory was placed in the tower of the Palace of the Inquisition. Then astronomer together with Levenstern and Bellingshausen filmed the Santa Cruz harbor. The filming was completed by October 22. Almost all the crew members were struck by the poverty of the local population, by the "highest degree of debauchery", as well as by the dominance of the Spanish Inquisition. Due to constant theft, the commanders even had to prohibit local citizens to visit the ships. Before the departure, Rezanov openly named himself the head of the expedition, and that led to the first open conflict between him and Krusenstern. Later Ratmanov wrote in his diary that at that time, Rezanov apologized and acknowledged that officers would not accept orders from a chamberlain. Later ambassador wrote a complaint to the name of the emperor, about which count Fyodor Tolstoy reported to Krusenstern. The latter started to talk to officers one-by-one about his authority on the ship.

Equator

After the farewell visit of the Spanish governor at noon on October 27, the sloops headed to islands of Cape Verde. After entering the ocean, the rank and file of those who serve were divided into three shifts of 15 people each, and this order was maintained even in the worst weather conditions. Out of fear of getting into a calm zone, vessels passed archipelago on November 6 at a distance of 25–28 miles from the island Santo Antão. After entering equatorial waters, the crews stretched awnings on the quarterdecks, and the sailors were forbidden to sleep outdoors. Then the weather was foggy and hot, there was no sun for several days in a row, and the temperature could reach 22-23 °R (27,5—28,7 °C). Thus, it was impossible to dry beds and clothes. In such days, Krusenstern used to order to heat the living quarters, to feed the crews with potatoes and pumpkins, to serve half of a Canarian wine bottle a day in addition to water, and to grant people with weak punch with sugar and lemon juice on the mornings. Frequent rains made it possible to collect a two-week water supply, and wash clothes and linen. The stretched awning was turned into a pool, which could be used by up to 20 people at a time. At the same time, naturalists discovered the reason for the Milky seas effect – Langsdorf located the smallest invertebrates in a microscope and refuted the prevailing chemical theory. On November 6, Rezanov and Krusenstern went to the Neva to worship, while due to idleness, Count Tolstoy and court adviser Fosse initiated a card game.

The ships crossed the equator at 22:30 on November 26 at 24° 20' west longitude. On both ships, the crews shouted "hurray!" three times. The ceremony was held the next day. Krusenstern, as one who had already crossed the equator, conducted the ceremony. The parade with an artillery salute was staged on both ships. Lisyansky ordered to prepare a soup with potatoes and pumpkins for the Neva crew, to fry ducks and to bake pudding and to grant one bottle of porter for each three people. On Nadezhda quartermaster Ivan Kurganov who "had excellent abilities and gift of speech" dressed up in Neptune and gave vodka to the crew that got "pretty drunk" afterwards. Judging by the Ratmanov's diary, ambassador Rezanov "came to the quarterdeck, wallowed along, raised arms and legs to the sky, constantly shouted "hurray!" to Krusenstern".

After they reached 20° south longitude, Krusenstern searched in vain for Ascension Island, the position of which was very inconsistent. Lisyansky all the more willingly agreed to the search because it did not require deviating from the main course. It was not possible to determine the position of the island, and the sailors considered it non-existent. According to the other version, both captains perfectly knew the location of the island and searched for the archipelago Trindade and Martin Vaz. In several years after, navigator Vasily Golovnin also coordinated the search during his voyage around-the-world on the sloop "Kamchatka".

Brazil (December 1803 — February 1804) 

Following the example of Laperouse, Krusenstern entered Brazil through the port Florianópolis that, compared to Rio de Janeiro, had softer climate, freshwater, cheaper food prices and cheaper tariffs. On December 21, the sloops entered the strait separating the island from the mainland and moored off at Santa Cruz fortress. The governor's residence was in 9¾ nautical miles from the place of anchorage. Joaquim Xavier Curado warmly welcomed Rezanov, Krusenstern and Lisyansky. In addition to assigning Portuguese officials to the sloops, all the necessary preparations were made on both ships, including chopping wood since due to high humidity the Russian crew experienced difficulties with physical work. Ambassador Rezanov and his retinue stayed with the governor while Horner was allowed to set up his observatory on Atomiris island where he immediately started recording the observations.

The main problem that held the expedition in Brazil for a long time was replacement work of Nevas fore and mainmast. In addition to that, from December 26, 1803, to January 22, 1804, the main grotto was also replaced. During that time, vessel was unloaded, pulled ashore, and thoroughly caulked. Rotten boards and fairleads in the sides and decks were replaced as well. Suitable mahogany was found in the island's forests, but it was very difficult to deliver it to the harbour for processing. Overall, it cost around 1300 piastres, including 1000 piastres issued to pay for the work of the Portuguese "mastmaker". At the same time, the crews were saved from the onset of gastric diseases due to the fact that instead of water they consumed tea and weak grog.

During the 5-week stay, officers and scientists had a lot of opportunities to explore the surroundings and local customs. Tilesius and Friderici stayed in the private house and had to pay for it five piastres per day since their initial hotel was very bad. Levenstern, Krusenstern and Ratmanov were most outraged by slavery. Levenstern even wrote that in the governor's summer house, where the retinue was staying, instead of a guard dog there was a slave-gatekeeper "who must himself seek food and not go away for a minute. Killing a black does not count as a murder here." Ratmanov even wrote that "Brazilian nature" disgusts him even giving into consideration that he was in town only three times. Langsdorf, who knew Portuguese language, was highly interested in everything: starting from mate consumption rates, the damage that cassava might cause to teeth, to how local indigenous people hunt and how to clean the cotton. However, he complained that due to extreme heat and humidity, most of the botanical specimens were mouldy and rotted, and ants ate all of the collected insects. Officers even went to Brazilian Carnival where they noticed that white people "have fun as European Catholics", while Blacks – "as Africans".

In Brazil, the conflict between Krusenstern and Rezanov took a new turn. The reason for that was that on December 28 Rezanov prohibited count Tolstoy to go onshore. The prohibition was later cancelled by Krusenstern. On December 29 the commander called an officers' meeting where he addressed the boundaries of the ambassador's powers for the first time. Officers assured him that they would not pay attention to "orders of the ambassador that does not serve the emperor, the expedition, or the Russian American company". Rezanov tried to command Lisyansky bypassing Krusenstern; however, no one obeyed. On December 31 officers drafted a letter to count Tolstoy to prevent him from the ambassador' attacks, and also described the situation to the emperor, deputy of the Minister for Maritime Pavel Chichagov and to Minister of Commerce Rumyantsev. After that the situation calmed down. During repair work on January 27, Krusenstern ordered to fence off the Rezanov's space in their common cabin. In addition to that, Tolstoy quarrelled with painter Kurlyandov, and they almost organized a duel. Kurlyandov complained to Krusenstern, the former reconciled them; however, it was not enough for the painter, and he went to Rezanov. The conflict between the academician of painting and the captain was resolved only seven weeks later.

Crossing the Pacific Ocean (February – June 1804)

Cape Horn. Neva on the Easter Island

On February 2, 1804, all repair works were completed, and Rezanov with his retinue returned to the vessel. In his honor, the governor of Curado gave a salute of 11 salvos, to which the Russian ships also responded with salvos. However, due to strong North winds, the departure was delayed until February 4. According to the initial expedition plan, vessels had to round Cape Horn in January. Thus, Krusenstern envisioned that if the vessels split, by April 12, being at latitude 45° and longitude 85°, it was supposed to head to Nuku-Hiva. However, if the split was impossible, then the expedition would have to head to Concepción and then turn to Hawaii. In addition to the strongest storms in the area of the "Roaring Forties", there was also a problem with the shortage of freshwater, which was supposed to last for four months. Because of that, starting from February 7, Krusenstern introduced strict rationing – two caps of water per person (including water used for cooking food and making tea). Vessels approached the latitude of Cape Horn on February 25 but headed south to avoid coming too close to the coastal cliffs. On February 26, barometer significantly "fell", but for the next two days wind allowed setting topsails up and staying at high speed. Only on February 27 the Nadezhdas jib was torn apart and Nevas tacking was unfolded. Since it got much colder (for the three weeks in all the living quarters it was no more than 3 °R or 3,75 °C), the crews on both of the vessels received winter clothes. Lisyansky ordered to cook pea soup on "dried broth", and give more pumpkins and onions in addition to salted food. If the pitching allowed, people used to set fire on the lower deck. According to the reckoning, the expedition reached the Pacific Ocean on March 3.

During the storm on March 25, the vessels eventually lost sight of each other. Since the closest shore was Valparaíso in 1000 nautical miles to the East, Lisyansky decided to head for the Easter Island. The storm on March 28-29 was so strong that Lisyansky changed his sceptic and agnostic view at the world, in his diaries he pondered about God and Providence. Starting from April 1, when the weather stabilized, a forge was installed on the Nevas deck and the crews started to forge axes, knives and nails for future exchange with the natives. On the board, there were descriptions of the island previously made by Cook, Forster and Laperouse. Neva reached the island at 1 am on April 15 on the distance of 35 nautical miles. After giving a volley to "clean up the guns", the battery was equipped with the warheads. Neva was near with volcano Katiki and Cape Roggeven. From the board, the crew could clearly see moai and cultivated plantations. However, due to fogs and heavy surf, the ship cruised off the coast for the next four days. Since anchor was impossible, on April 21, Lisyansky sent Lieutenant Povalishin with gifts for the islanders (knives, bottles, etc.) to the shore in order to leave a message for Krusenstern in case if Nadezhda enters the island. Povalishin took a navigator and four sailors with him; they were insured from the board. Clerk Korobitsyn noted that the islanders willingly gave away bananas, yams, sweet potato or sugar cane for mirrors, scissors, and especially knives. A bottle sealed with wax and a note to Krusenstern was also handed over. Povalishin managed to get a full boat of products, as well as some ethnographic objects, in particular, a patterned mat. Concluding the description of the island, Lisyansky corrected the coordinates and calculations of the number of Paschal people that were made by Cook. According to G. Barrat, Lisyansky's demographic calculations were quite correct.

The island of Nuku Hiva

The storm that parted Nadezhda and Neva raged until March 31 and the weather eventually stabilized by April 8. The first warm day on Nadezhda was only on April 10 and the crews used for cleaning up the artillery.

Count Tolstoy organized some training, while some of the crew members sewn sails. Doctor Espenberg conducted a thorough medical examination and concluded that despite the constant lack of freshwater and a 10-week stay in a highly adverse climate, all unter-officers and sailors were healthy. Since Rezanov insisted on the soonest delivery of the RAC' cargos, Krusenstern decided to head to Nuku Hiva, bypassing Easter island directly. The blacksmith was set to forge nails, knives and axes to trade with the Polynesians. Weather was unstable – even though on April 17 the vessel crossed tropic of Capricorn, squalls continued for the other five days. Only after that, prevailing trade winds brought the vessel back to track. Every morning and night people who were promised a reward looked forward from crosstrees and bowsprit hoping to see the islands. After a heavy storm on May 5, at the sunrise, the crew saw Fatu-Hiva, Hiva Oa and Ua Huka islands. Due to fog, the ship had to lower all sails and reached Nuku-Hiva around 5 pm.

Krusenstern and his crew spent on Washington islands (that were part of the Marquesas Islands) 11 days, from 7 to 18 May 1804. They settled on the Eastern shore on April 24 (according to the Julian calendar). Krusenstern decided to use bay Anna-Maria as a base. In local languages, the bay was referred as "Taiohe". The local tribe was led by a separate leader. Krusenstern and his crew were able to contact the leader of Kiatonui (expedition members referred to it as "Tapega") thanks to Englishman Roberts, who was the leader's son-in-law. His antagonist was Frenchman Cabri, who was married to a daughter of a leader of a lower rank.

The expedition struggled with the problem of where to get more fresh water and provisions. Krusenstern wrote that local tribes willingly suggested coconuts, bananas and breadfruit. The most profitable way for the crew was to sell the locals some pieces of barrel five-inch iron hoops, which were abundantly stocked for this purpose in Kronstadt. The islanders sharpened them and made blades for axes or tesla. On May 11, Neva also reached the island. Lisyansky met Krusenstern and the leader of Katonui. The crews could not obtain fresh meat because the locals had a minimal amount of pigs. After all, the teams got only four pigs and three piggies that were immediately eaten by the crews. On May 12 there was an incident: the leader of Katonui lingered at Nadezhda, and his tribe decided that he was captured, and took out their weapons. At that time sailors were conducting freshwater, and the islanders (including the leaders of low rank) tossed full barrels and carried them through the surf.

To prevent incidents (taking into considerations that there were a lot of cannibals on the island), Krusenstern and Lisyansky prohibited officers, sailors and scientists to visit the island alone. They were only allowed to go ashore in organized groups that were led by officers. Botanist Brinkin never went ashore out of fear before the "cannibals". However, most members of the scientific group took the customs of the islanders for granted. Even though Europeans had previously visited Nuku Hiva, there was no epidemic of sexually transmitted diseases on the island. Krusenstern rationalized the entertainment of the crew: according to Levenstern's description, a signal "Women, come here!" used to be sent from the ship to the beach, the girls were allowed to board in order, after which "capable ones searched for a mate". In the morning, the captain counted those who departed. All the participants in the trip described Polynesian Sexual customs (meaning guest marriages and polyandry). However, Langsdorf was the one who noticed that only women of lower social status served as seafarers. Krusenstern and Ratmanov were disappointed by their appearance. However, if the combat officer noted that Polynesians are "ugly" and do not correspond to the descriptions of Bugenvil or Foster, the captain wrote that European canons of beauty differ from the Marqesian ones. Tilesius and Langsdorf met aristocrats during the excursions along the coast and noted their high growth, harmony, "liveliness and exquisite manners", as well as the use of clothing.

Among other customs, people got interested in local tattoos: Marquesinas used to tattoo the whole surface of their body, including head, and only Māori people has somewhat similar practices. Members of the expedition got amused by the fact that tattoo artists might copy inscriptions in any languages. Not only sailors tattooed different signs as well, but even Krusenstern tattooed the name of his wife that he "desperately admires of", on his arm. Ratmanov tattooed some French inscription a bit upper his heart and count Tolstoy also made his first tattoo exactly on the Marquesas islands.

On Nuku Hiva, a sharp outbreak of conflict happened between Krusenstern and Rezanov. When Nadezhda arrived at the port Anna-Maria, Krusenstern prohibited the exchange of the RAC's axes to local rarities (pieces of jewellery or weapons) in hope to save them for buying more pigs later. The captain even read the order out loud on May 7. He used the example of George Vancouver who did the same during his expedition in Tahiti. Rezanov and merchant Shemelin violated the order, thus, on May 9 Krusenstern had to introduce free exchange again. It resulted in sharp deprecation of iron hoops, and Shemelin in his notes that were published in 1818 noted that it turned out to be impossible to buy pigs precisely because of the trade crisis caused by Rezanov. At the same time, Rezanov ordered Shemelin to exchange as many rarities as possible for Kunstkamera collection. However, the process got complicated: islanders demanded only hoops and knives. For example, on May 13 Shemelin bought a signal shell, human skull, and several folding knives. Finally, on May 14 a public argument between Rezanov and Krusenstern took place, in which Shemelin and Lisyansky also participated. According to the notes from both sides, the ambassador called captain's actions "childish" and proclaimed that buying proviant is not in his competition while collecting objects for Kunstkamera was a direct order from the emperor. Krusenstern was reprimanded, to which he replied that he does not obey to Rezanov. Officers from both of the vessels demanded Rezanov to provide public clarifications and public demonstrations of the official instructions, while Rezanov could not even name the name of his instructor (it was count Rumyantsev), and Lisyansky, judging by the notes made by Rezanov, openly said that emperor Alexander "can sign up pretty much everything".

It is notable that the letter that Lisyansky sent to Krusenstern the next day, directly states: "Before today I considered myself in your command [as captain], but now it turns out that I have another commander". Ratmanov even claimed that after Rezanov's proclamation that "he is everything and Krusenstern is nothing", the ambassador could not prove his position documentary. According to a historian of the Russian navy N. Klado, Rezanov had only the highest rescript in which nothing was said about the order of submission. If it was the other way around, Krusenstern could not be so confident against senior in age and rank (chamberlain in the Table of Ranks related to the same class as a contr-admiral).

On Nuku Hiva Krusenstern discovered and described an excellent harbour, which he called the port of Chichagova. It was located southwest of Taiokhae (port of Anna Maria). A flurry blew before the departure on May 17. Neva managed to leave the bay under sails, while Nadezhda squeezed to the west bank at 4 am and was threatened with death. The commander was able to save the sloop only by using verps, and by sacrificing an 18-pound verp anchor and two cable ropes. Frenchman Cabri accidentally got on board (he was staying for a night and then did not dare to swim a few miles to the coast in such stormy weather). Later he claimed that Krusenstern made him stay by force. After coming back to Europe through Kamchatka, Siberia and Petersburg, his fate was quite tragic. Trying not to aggravate any conflict, Rezanov voluntarily stayed in his half of the captain's cabin prior to arrival to Kamchatka.

Shared voyage to Hawaii

Due to route length from the Northern part of the Pacific Ocean to Japan, vessels faced with the necessity to visit Hawaiian islands to update the stocks. Since the crew failed to get fresh meat on Nuku Hiva, Krusenstern was afraid of a possible scurvy outbreak even though no one member of the crews had any signs of the disease. Just in case Lisyansky started to hunt sharks, on May 20 he even caught a 7-foot fish. The shark meat was prepared for the Neva crew, and only the captain himself did not like the new dish. When the weather had stabilized, members of the expedition resumed oceanographic observations that Horner carried out between May 22-24 by putting the thermometer on 100 fathoms and depicting the difference in temperatures in 10 °R. On Friday 25 at 3 pm on 146° West longitude, the expedition crossed the equator again in the North direction. On May 30, Johann Neumann, who served as the personal cook of count Rezanov, died. Initially, while discussing the personnel back in Saint Petersburg, Krusenstern did not want to take him because Neumann was already ill with consumption. In his diary, Ratmanov mentioned that Rezanov forced Neumann to go. In Brazil Neumann started coughing with blood, and Krusenstern suggested to pay him 1,5-year salary, so Neumann can stay in Santa-Katharina where his health might significantly improve due to climate. However, Neumann decided to travel further, but the climate of Cape Horn completely stripped away his health. He was buried according to maritime custom. Hieromonk Gideon refused to attend the ceremony because, according to Levenstern, "the late one was not even a Lutheranism". Probably, Neumann was Jewish.

On June 8 at 9 am the Hawaii island became visible (Krusenstern called it "Ovagi", and Lisyansky – "Ovigi"), and the vessels arrived at the shore around 2 pm. Locals on boats approached the ships and started to suggest small things for exchange. Thus, for a night, both sloops moved away from the coast and drifted nearby. On June 9 the aborigines brought in a 2½-pound pig. However, both sides could not set up a deal because locals asked for clothes that the crews did not have. At the same time, a big leak opened on Nadezhda because the draft of the vessel decreased as the reserves depleted, and decayed caulking on the waterline scattered in the air. Sailors had to pump off the water once or even twice a day. Krusenstern was horrified by the fact that all Hawaiians whom he met had apparent signs of the diseases (sexually transmitted or dermatitis caused by excessive use of cava). Frenchman Cabri who wanted to board off and return to Nuku Hiva, also disdained the "scabby Hawaiians" (as described by Levenstern) and decided to continue his trip to Kamchatka. After reaching Kealakekua Bay, Krusenstern ordered Espenberg to conduct a thorough medical examination. The results showed that the vessels might travel directly to Russian possessions because stocks on board allowed it. On June 10 at 8 pm Nadezhda returned to the sea.

Neva remained on Hawaiian islands until June 16. After landing ashore, the crew found out that Englishman Jung led all local businesses because a local leader moved to Oahu. On June 12 both sides started the bargaining round. The crew bought two pigs and different roots in exchange for two axes and three bottles of rum. Officers and sailors actively bought various local handicrafts. Aborigines usually traded for textile, even for canvases. Aborigines claimed that Jung prohibited to sell pigs, however, despite the prohibition, Hawaiian foreman brought up two big pigs, two piggies, two goats and 10 hens, a barrel of sweet potatoes, as well as taro, coconuts and sugarcane. Lisyansky prohibited women from entering the ship. This time aborigines also willingly bought strip iron. At the evening, Lisyansky visited the place of Cooks' death, pagan church, the local leader's house, and the shipyard, where locals were completing the construction of a double canoe. Leader imposed on the Russians taboo. Thus the locals stayed away from them. Bargain continued until June 13 and June 14, then, finally, Jung arrived at the vessels – it turned out to be that he was not notified about the Russian presence. Lisyansky did not invite him for a dinner, after that Englishman became nice, gave two big pigs to the crew and tried to make his best to make amends for his impoliteness. He brought the officers back to the place where Cook died, where he conducted a short but detailed tour for the group. On June 15 American fishers arrived to Neva and notified the commander about the battle of Sitka. On June 16 the crews managed to buy 8 pigs (4 from Jung and 4 from the Hawaiian foreman) in exchange for a canvas. After that, Lisyansky counted that there should be enough provision to make it to Alaska. On June 17 Neva anchored and headed towards the island of Maui. After visiting Kauai, on June 20 Lisyansky directly set the route to Unalaska Island.

Nadezhda on Kamchatka, Sakhalin and in Japan (July 1804 – 1805)

Petropavlovsk-Kamchatsky. Equipping the embassy to Japan

Krusenstern constructed the route to Kamchatka thus it would not lag for more than 100-120 miles from the original route paved by James Cook. On June 22 the vessels crossed tropic of Cancer and got to a two-week calm, during which the surface of the ocean was mirrored, which the captain had previously observed only in the Baltic. Using the perfect weather conditions, Horner and Langsdorf started to measure the temperature at different sea levels, and to catch marine animals, particularly, jellyfish "Onisius". Following the Rumyantsev' instructions, they were also searching for a ghost island that was supposedly located to the east of Japan, and that many unsuccessfully tried to locate starting from 1610. On July 13 Kamchatka's shore became visible, and on July 14 the sloop reached Cape Povorotny. Because of the calm, the vessel arrived to Petropavlovsk-Kamchatsky only at 1 pm on July 15, making the transition from the island of Hawaii in 35 days. During that time, only once a person had symptoms of scurvy, he needed eight days for a full recovery.

The port commander Major Krupsky, who settled the ambassador in his own house, took up the arrangement. They fed the crew with fresh bread and fish every day, so the team can get back in shape after a 5-months journey from Brazil. The sloop was moored in 50 fathoms from the coast; the goods were brought to the shore while the ship itself was repaired. In his letter to the governor that was sent on the day of the arrival, Rezanov wrote directly "naval officers rebelled on my board". At the same time, he could not take any actions until the governor returned to the capital of Kamchatka on August 10 – after 26 days of being absent. However, during the unloading of the embassy property on June 30, Rezanov could not stand it and attacked Krusenstern. Judging by the Levenstern's description, the ambassador threatened to put all officers in pads (except Golovachev), and hang them.

Accusations made by Rezanov were so serious that the governor Koshelev had to give this case a go. At the same time, there was no official documentation that could prove Rezanov's version of the event. The only evidence that tells about the governor position in the incident was the report on the name of  that was sent on August 26 (September 7) 1804 – the day when Nadezhda headed to Japan. Judging by the document, Kosheleved pulled away from the discussion. According to the Levenstern's diary, Major general told Rezanov that he was a witness, not a judge. In his letter to a vice-minister of Minister of Justice Nikolay Novosiltsev from June 12 (24) 1805, Krusenstern described his version of the events. Captain decided to force the situation and make Rezanov take a position for which he would be responsible. On the day of the trial where Koshelev was present, Krusenstern handed his sword to the general and demanded his departure to Petersburg. Ratmanov later stated that "the ambassador came to his senses and started to look for an agreement", persuading the captain to go to Japan, after which he will leave the sloop. Partly this happened because lieutenant claimed that if Krusenstern leaves, he will also leave the vessel. Ratmanov thought that the phrase in the Rumyantsev instruction about subordination of both vessels to Rezanov, was written by the ambassador himself.

Then comes the main discrepancy: in his letter Rezanov wrote that Krusenstern apologized to him for violating the subordination on board. At the same time, Krusenstern mentioned that it was Rezanov who apologized to Krusenstern. Interpretation of evidence highly depends on the position that the researcher might take. Levenstern and Ratmanov claimed that it was Rezanov who apologized, and the officers even consulted if they would accept his apologies or not. Levenstern later noted that both sides did not have a choice because the embassy to Japan had to be taken. Thus, both officers and Krusenstern should "suppress all personal grudges, all quarrels, and follow the emperor's will and the aims of the expedition". Eventually, on August 16, the official truce took place. In his letter to the emperor, that Rezanov sent the same day, he emphasized Krusenstern's merit as a leader. However, prior to the arrival to Kamchatka, the relationship was extremely strained, even though there were no open quarrels.

Before departing to Japan, count Tolstoy, botanist Brinkin and painter Kurlyandov went ashore from where they would have to travel back home by land. The main reason for that is that they became outcasts on board. Brinkin, according to Levenstern, committed suicide after returning to St. Petersburg. Kurlyandov got sick on his way home and settled down in Kazan where he taught in the Kazan Theological Seminary. The question of whether Tolstoy actually visited America, where he got his nickname, remains confusing. "Wild Frenchman" Kabri was also sent ashore. Rezanov took an "honour guard" on vacated seats: captain of the battalion of Petropavlovsk Ivan Fedorov, lieutenant Dmitry Koshelev – brother of the governor, and eight non-commissioned and privates. They were supposed to return home after the end of the embassy mission. According to the letter of F. Romberg, the "honour guard" received urgently prepared uniforms with gold embroideries on them, while guards bear caps were originally taken from St. Petersburg. They departed on August 30.

The unsuccessful embassy to Japan

Constant light rain and fog chased the crew in Kamchatka and during their first ten days on the way to Japan. On September 11 it transformed into a massive storm. The leak on the board got more prominent, and the crew had to score four bulls that they got on Kamchatka, because the animals could not bear the pitching. The first clear day was September 24, Japan got visible on September 28. Due to a massive storm, the vessels could not get closer, and navigation by Krusenstern and Horner showed that existing maps, even including Aaron Arrowsmith's, were not reliable enough. On October 3 the sloop reached the shore of Satsuma Domain. The local government notified the governor of Nagasaki. Nadezhda reached the Nagasaki strait around 5:30 pm on October 8. Rezanov had an "open list" from the Batavian Republic and the precept in the name of the head of the Dutch East India Company Hendrick Doof for assisting in maintaining the embassy's mission.

At that time, relations with the Eastern countries were not in priority for the Russian authorities. Rezanov's instruction stated: "make decisions according to Japanese customs and do not abase oneself". The letter from the emperor Alexander I addressed the "Emperor of Japan", by which he meant Shōgun. When the former embassy led by Adam Laxman arrived in Japan, local authorities allowed only one ship to stay in the bay. Under these conditions, Rezanov was supposed to conclude a trade agreement between two states, and initiate trade relations either in Nagasaki or in Hokkaido. To endear the Japanese side, it was decided to bring home the Japanese victims of ship wreckage that happened in 1794 near the Andreanof Islands. Rezanov had 50 boxes containing gifts for the Japanese authorities, in the hope to interest them in potential items to trade. Prevailingly, these were items made from glass and crystal: chandeliers, candelabras, 15 crystal and marble countertops in different colours, 71 large mirrors and 25 smaller mirrors, six porcelain sets from the Imperial Porcelain Factory, ivory vases, fur products. Later Levenstern wrote in his diary that Rezanov and Fosse wanted to sell gifts that were not accepted by the Japanese side because it was a "real crap". Lieutenant also noted that although fox furs were highly valued in Russia, in Japan they are considered to be as a kitsune or "unclean animal". The only thing that caused genuine interest from the Japanese side was the clock (English work) from the Hermitage in a shape of an elephant, that was able to turn the trunk and ears, and the kaleidoscopic lights made by Russian inventor Ivan Kulibin.

Japanese authorities sent translators of the lowest rank to conduct negotiations, who demanded the same ceremonial as for Dutch. Krusenstern, Rezanov, merchant Shemelin depicted arguments regarding whom and how many times to bow. Levenstern drew Japanese authorities clarifying types of bowings. Japanese could not understand the reason why Russians resented, assuming that they should obey common rules and follow the example of Dutch. Storms frayed the Nadezhda, and the vessel desperately needed repair works. The crew even had to agree to disarm the ship and put the whole stock of gunpowder in the Japanese arsenal; they took all the guns and several anchors. Only after small bargaining with the local officials, the crew was allowed to keep the swords, and the honour guard – guns. Rezanov preached self-humiliation to the crew before the Japanese authorities, but he, answering questions from the Japanese side, behaved arrogantly and aroused many suspicions. As a result, the sloop was transferred to the internal raid in Nagasaki only on November 9 – in a month after the arrival. Due to the extreme restraint of the ambassador, only on December 17 the team was allowed to go ashore. Rezanov was provided with a house and warehouses in Megasaki (street Umegasaki), while the sloop was put for a repair works in Kibati. The ambassador's house was rounded with a bamboo fence, and more resembled a prison. Rezanov, after a year of travelling in extreme conditions when his authority was constantly disputed, did not have a desire and strength to follow Japanese and European vision on diplomatic representation. He constantly scolded his retinue, cursed with translators, and each of his steps was recorded and reported to higher authorities. There were also incidents of another kind: when women were delivered to the embassy, Rezanov complained that locals use teeth blackening. Authorities resented him, and said that "Russians have the same tastes as Dutch".

Sailors on the Nadezhda found themselves in even more cramped position. They were allowed to go ashore only to the one specific spot that was "one hundred and forty steps" long, limited by a fence, and was kept under guard. There were three trees on the site; the ground was covered with sand, only the small arbour covered people from the rain. Overall, it looked like a prisoner walk. Nevertheless, Levenstern claimed that due to the fact that Japanese did not know that it is possible to make triangulation and cartography from the board, for that short period, officers on the Nadezhda were able to conduct more material than Dutch for 300 years. In these conditions, Langsdorf and Tilesius conducted research on climate and ichthyology. To do that, they convinced local fishers that daily delivered them fresh food, to provide them with new biological types every time they come. Later Langsdorf claimed that for the three months that they were in Megasaki, researchers received 400 fish specimen of 150 different origins, that he later draw and described. Also, fishers provided him with drawings of local animals. Conduction of biological specimen was quite often mentioned in the Levenstern's diary from December 6, 1804, to April 5, 1805: through suppliers or translators they were able to obtain 8 species of snails, 24 species of birds, 16 species of fish for stuffing were obtained (obtaining fresh supplies was described separately). The total weight of the fish alone for the samples was 128 Japanese catti, which corresponded to 4 pounds 32 pounds (78 kg). In January 1805 Langsdorf glued a balloon from silk and paper, which was once run on a leash, despite Rezanov's displeasure. The second launch attempt happened on February 6, and ended up with the ball being ripped off by the wind and thrown onto the roof of one of the city's houses. After that, the scientist switched to flying kites. Other news was not comforting either: of the four returned Japanese, one, Tatsuro, cut off his tongue with a kitchen knife on January 28, and tried to cut his throat. The guards managed to stop him, and the Japanese doctor completely healed the wounds, although it was already impossible to restore his voice.

Even though Rezanov knew the basics of the Japanese language, he did not understand that the Japanese surrounding him were specialists – Rangaku, that is, professional Dutch scholars, experienced, versatile specialists. Ratmanov called them "reasonable beasts". The most famous Japanese scientist that was attached to the embassy was  that later wrote a book about officers and researchers on Nadezhda based on conversations with the crew and those Japanese who returned home. He highly praised the moral qualities and scientific qualifications of Langsdorf. The embassy was closely watched by another famous intellectual and artist Ōta Nanpo. He, in particular, copied South American drawings that were made by the members of the expedition.

The ill-conceived actions of the ambassador significantly complicated the course of negotiations. For instance, Rezanov even tried to fake his disease, blackmailing the governor with the anger of the Russian sovereign. He also demanded Japanese doctors although he had Tilesius and Langsdorf in his retinue who had medical degrees and large practical experience. Japanese doctors visited Rezanov on February 10, 1805, and could not find out any serious diseases. The next day the ambassador proclaimed that by doing that he wanted to demonstrate respect and trust to the Japanese side. There was also another incident: Rezanov much liked Japanese Aizu-style caskets (black and gold-plated), and he demanded 500 copies of them as a deposit before the trade starts. When the trade did not happen, he embezzled them. The meeting did not go well; both representatives received the ambassador coldly. Despite the heavy rain, only Rezanov was invited to the tent where the representatives told him that they completely reject any type of trade relations On April 7 there was a farewell ceremony where Russian members of the crew expressed a desire to leave Japan as soon as possible. Russian gifts were not accepted, but the Japanese side did take money for the materials that were used for repairing the Russian ship – boards, bars and 500 copper sheets – as well as provision for the crew and the retinue. Following the order of Shōgun, 5569 kg of rice, 23,7 ton of salt, and 25 boxes of silk wool were given to the crew as a gift. The Japanese side also provided Nadezhda with provision for the trip back to Kamchatka: 2457 kg of dried bread, three boxes of powder, 15 boxes of sake, salted fish, 28 пудов salted pork and live cattle. It took ten days with 16-hour working hours to load all provision on board, as well as returned weapons.  accused Rezanov what he embezzled all the received things by the name of "RAC's property" and wanted to sell them in Kamchatka or Kodiak. In the end, officers gave up their part of sault to sailors, and, following the Krusenstern's order, 1228 kg of rice was given to the needed citizens of Kamchatka.

Second visit to Kamchatka

Despite extreme discontent of the Japanese authorities, Krusenstern decided to return the embassy in Petropavlovsk through the Sea of Japan – along the west coast of Honshu and Hokkaido which was quite unknown to Europeans. Stormy weather prevailed after the departure. From the Gotō Islands Nadezhda headed North to the Tsushima Island that it passed by on April 19. Only on May 1, the vessel reached the Tsugaru strait. It headed further, primarily because Krusenstern wanted to find the strait (that was drawn on his map) dividing island Esso (Hokkaido) from Karafuto. On May 7-9 Krusenstern realized that Karafuto corresponds to Sakhalin on Russian and French maps. Then the expedition went through the La Pérouse Strait, correcting many mistakes on the maps drawn by Lapérouse. On May 14 Nadezhda anchored in the Aniva Bay. In the morning of May 15, Langsdorf and Ratmanov went describing the shore, and Rezanov and Krusenstern went to local settlement to establishing contact with Ainu people. After talking with them, Krusenstern suggested that their native lands were under the constant Japanese attacks, and it would be highly desirable to establish Russian trading post right there. Ainu treated sailors with rice and fresh fish, from which they prepared pilaf. At 8 pm on May 16, the expedition rounded the Cape of Aniva, and on May 17 it arrived in the Gulf of Patience which was described by lieutenant Golovachev. On May 20 they discovered a cape which was named after Mulovsky. On May 22 they described the Cape of Soymonov. On May 24, powerful fields of perennial ice at 48 ° C blocked the path. Coming between the islands of Mussir and Raukokke, the crew discovered four more islands – . After a massive storm, on June 1 the expedition passed the islands of Ekarma and Shiashkotan. On June 5, the crew arrived to Petropavlovsk.

During their travel to Kamchatka, the crew on Nadezhda unwillingly participated in the medical experiment – one of the honour guards got infected with a smallpox while being in Megasaki. He was initially from Kamchatka where vaccination against the disease was not mandatory. Krusenstern was not so much concerned with a potential epidemy on board (even though there was no opportunity to declare a quarantine), rather than with a possible spread of the disease in Petropavlovsk. After a short investigation, Krusenstern found out that every member of the crew (except for two sailors) who travelled from St. Petersburg, were vaccinated. Espenberg personally vaccinated them, but they did not get infected, from which it was concluded that they "already had a smallpox". Before the arrival to Petropavlovsk, all the property of the recovering soldier (including linen and bunk) was thrown into the sea, soldiers' belongings that were left in Kamchatka were treated with sulfur, and the bunks and belongings of the sailors were washed in boiling water with a bar of soap. After the arrival, infected soldat was put in a 3-week quarantine, while the crew was prohibited from communicating with the locals. By introducing these restrictions, Krusenstern referred to consequences of the smallpox epidemic in 1767.

Later it was found out that Alexander I sent to Krusenstern and Rezanov the gracious rescript dated April 28, 1805. According to the document, Krusenstern was awarded an Order of Saint Anna of the 2nd degree. At the same time, Chamberlain Rezanov received a golden snuff box decorated with diamonds. Both of them received a letter from Rumyantsev in which the count proposed Rezanov to "investigate the American shore from the Kodiak Island to the Bering Strait." Langsdorf also decided to go with the RAC's representative, because he was interested in observing the "natural wealth" of Russian America. The procession left Nadezhda – Fosse was sent with a report to Okhotsk and then to Saint Petersburg by land. Major Friderici was left on the sloop (Levenstern and Ratmanov claimed that there were some rumours about his intimate relationship with Cadet Moritz von Kotzebue). Since Krusenstern planned to explore Sakhalin during the summer, Friderici and Shemelin were landed off in Petropavlovsk. Later they joined the crew again and travelled to Saint Petersburg through China in the fall.

Study of Sakhalin. Third visit to Kamchatka

Ship departure was scheduled for June 21; however, the governor was still on the Northside, trying to establish relations with Chukchi. Besides that, one of the boilers in the galley required repair. On June 25 Rezanov departed to the New World on the vessel Maria. On July 1, governor Koshelev arrived in Avacha Bay. Departure was significantly delayed because Krusenstern found out that Rezanov had written a lot of letters to St. Petersburg. Fearing denunciations and aiming at neutralizing possible consequences, the captain had to get the governor's support.

Reaching the open sea at 4 am on July 5, Krusenstern first aimed at getting closer to the Lovushki islands, geographic coordinates of which he could not locate before due to cloudy weather. However, upon the arrival at the place on July 6, the sloop was again covered with a thick fog. Perfect weather for conducting scientific observations stabilized on July 19. Because of that, the crew was able to detect the coordinates of the Cape Gvozdev and found the Cape Bellingshausen. On July 25-29 Nadezhda was again chased with the storm; however, the crew did not know that in this place off the coast of Sakhalin there were neither large shallows nor reefs. Only on August 9, the expedition reached the Northern part of the island with the capes "Maria" and "Elizabeth". Krusenstern thought that the newly discovered northern strait is more suitable and safe harbour than Tenerife or Madeira. There they discovered a settlement of Nivkh people ("Chinese Tatars") which Levenstern, Tilesius and Horner decided to visit. However, they met a hostile reception and hastened to retire. On August 12 Nadezhda entered the channel that divided Sakhalin from the mainland. At 11 am on August 13, the coast of the Asian mainland with two mountain ranges was seen, and the width of the strait, as it seemed, did not exceed 5 miles. The water was so fresh that Krusenstern concluded that the mouth of the Amur river is somewhere nearby. As the depth quickly fell, a rowing boat was lowered down, on which lieutenant Romberg measured the bottom. The depth did not exceed 7-8 metres and rapidly decreased closer to the Asian coast. The crew discovered a new cape in the Strait of Tartary that was later called in the name of Khabarov. Due to a strong counter-current, Krusenstern decided not to take any risks and announced that Sakhalin is undoubtedly a peninsula. However, he also added that it would be useful to send the next expedition for exploring 80-100 miles of the Tatar Strait and locating the exact coordinates of the mouth of the Amur. Such expedition was carried out only in 1849 by Gennady Nevelskoy.

Due to mists and storms, exploration of Sakhalin got dragged on, while Nadezhda was supposed to meet the Neva in Guangzhou. An attempt to finish describing the Kuril Islands and Kamchatka failed due to fogs. On August 30 at 3 pm, everyone safely returned to Petropavlovsk: 

The news was disappointing: materials and provision that were ordered from Okhotsk had not arrived yet, and only on September 2 the official transport came under the command of midshipman Steingel. Nadezhda needed a complete change of rigging. Ballast and 70 cubic fathoms of firewood for the whole return trip were delivered to the ship. Provision from Okhotsk was bad: the crew took only corned beef for three months (it went bad after six weeks), and crackers for four months, but already in China, they were not even suitable for a livestock feed. Because the works got delayed, officers followed the Ratmanov's initiative and decided to renew the grave of captain Charles Clerke. On September 15 they built up a pyramid made of birch wood, painted marble, and surrounded by a balustrade and a moat. Tilesius painted the coat of arms in the Cook's travel description with an oil paint. Also on September 20, the transport from Unalashka arrived with the news from Lisyansky and a small load of furs for sale in China (400 skins of sea otters and 10,000 fur seals). The governor's brother Dmitry Koshelev delivered potato, vegetables (including beet), berries, and four bulls ( these were gifts from Kamchatka) to the ship. Finally, on Saturday, on October 5, Nadezhda was dragged to the bay and at 2 pm the vessel reached the open sea.

Before the departure, the crew found out that in 1805 new changes in the merchant flag were introduced. Thus, from Kamchatka to China, Nadezhda travelled with a nine-lane frag – tripled tricolour. These innovations did not last long.

Arrival of Neva in Russian America (August 1804 – November 1805)

Fight for Novo-Arkhangelsk

The transition of Neva from Kauai to Kodiak lasted for 25 days. Generally, the trip went calm, except that the weather was rainy and the frosts began to prevail. According to Lisyansky, due to the abundance of fresh pork on board, many people started to suffer from the gastric infection. However, they were quickly cured with quinine. The vessel arrived on July 10. Already in Brazil Hieromonk Gideon had received an order from Rezanov to head the Kodial school and the organization of pastoral activities. Thus, he went ashore upon the arrival in Kodiak. He was supposed to return to Russia with the messenger, not on the Neva.

After the arrival, Neva found itself in the middle of the armed conflict. On July 13 Lisyansky received a request from merchant Alexander Andreyevich Baranov to help in liberating Sitka from Tlingits. Baranov had on his side transport Ermak, 120 armed Russian hunters and industrialists, as well as 800 indigenous allied forces on 350 kayaks. The 14-gun sloop significantly strengthened the squadron. Negotiations with the head of the indigenous population of Sitka – Sitcan toyon Kotlean – failed because Baranov demanded to surrender the fortress and pass on reliable  to Russians. On October 1, 1804, naval guns bombarded the Sitcan fortifications. However, it was not successful since guns' calibre was small, the palisade was thick, and the Indigenous peoples of the Americas took refuge in ditches or underground passages. Thus, Lisyansky landed troops with a field gun, under the command of Lieutenant P. P. Arbuzov. Baranov and Lieutenant P. A. Povalishin with four guns attacked from the other side. Even though Tlingits fired from falconets and rifles, the Russians started the assault. The attempt of frontal attack was repulsed by the Indigenous peoples – Povalishin was injured in the chest, the podlekar Mutovkin received bullet wounds in his arm and leg, seven sailors got wounds of varying severity. Rankers Artemy Pavlov and Andrei Ivanov fell in the battle; sailor Ivan Sergeev died the next day from the received injuries. Nevertheless, the position of the Indigenous peoples was doomed. On October 2 both sides started negotiations, however, already on October 7, the main forces of the Indigenous peoples fled through the mountains. As a result of the conflict, a fortress Novo-Arkhangelsk was founded, and Russian authority in the region was extended to the Alexander Archipelago.

Wintering in Kodiak 

The winter was approaching, and on November 10, 1804, Neva returned to Kodiak to the harbour of St. Paul. By November 16 the sloop was outfitted, and the crew was transferred ashore. With the advent of cold weather, Lisyansky detected the temperature in 5,5 °F (−14,7 °С). Wintering lasted for 11 months during which the crew lived in comfortable accommodations. Moreover, sailors engaged in fishing and winter haunting. On Svyatki the crew staged a theatrical performance, and for Maslenitsa they built an ice slide. The frost lasted until March 9, 1805; the lowest measured temperature was −17.5 ° C (9 pm on January 22). Preparations for the departure started on March 20. From March 22, Lisyansky, with navigator Kalinin and one sailor went on three canoes to conduct geographic surveys. By April 12 they had compiled a map of the Kodiak archipelago, the Chiniat Gulf, the Pavlovsk harbour, and Three Hierarchs Bay.

The RAC's counterman Nikolay Korobitsyn made the main decisions regarding this stage of the expedition. He was also supposed to take furs on board for trading in China. Overall, Neva delivered goods for 310,000 rubles from St. Petersburg, and received furs and walrus bones total cost of 440,000 rubles. Besides loading the goods, the crew had to make a new bowsprit for the sloop that delayed the departure until June 13. The expedition left the Pavlovsk Harbor only at 2 pm on November 16. On June 22, Neva arrived in Novo-Arkhangelsk. During the winter, eight large wooden buildings were constructed, about which Lisyansky wrote that in size and decoration they would have looked quite worthy even in Europe. Neva greeted ruler Baranov with a salute of 9 shots. He was also invited for dinner with the captain. From July 2 to 7, navigator Kalinin was on the Kruzof Island where he described the bay and the Mount Edgecumbe. Lisyansky was so interested in Edgecumbe that on July 21-22 he, together with Povalishin climbed and explored a crater that was overgrown with dense forest. While later describing the journey, the captain greatly exaggerated the height of the mountain.

Transition to China
After a farewell to Baranov, around 6 pm on September 1, 1805, Neva went to the open sea. To replenish people who left the ship, Lisyansky took aboard two Kodiak aboriginal kayakers and four Russian-Indian mestizo to teach them sailing. Already on September 2, the vessels got into a massive storm that later transformed into a full calm. 

One of the aims that Lisyansky had was finding the unknown lands located to the East of Japan. Ship rangers were unsuccessfully looking for land on the horizon, while at 10 pm on October 15, being at 26°43' North latitude and 173°23' West longitude, Neva stranded on corals. By throwing spare yards and rods, and guns, overboard, the crew was able to pull the sloop into deeper water. However, in the morning, a massive storm put the ship back to corals. Even though the keel got damaged, and there was a high risk of destroying the whole ship, the crew successfully dealt with this problem. They even collected all the yards, rods and guns that were previously thrown into the sea. This is how they discovered an uninhabited island that was later named after Lisyansky. Despite the intense heat, the captain went ashore and buried a bottle, with a letter about his priority to the land, into coral sand. However, the damage to the sloop was so significant that Lisyansky later regretted that he was not able to look for unknown areas any further.

By October 31 the crew had only 30-days supply of dried bread left. Thus, the ratio was reduced to a quarter pound per person. Only on November 16, the crew was able to see the Tinian's extremity, and then, all the Northern Mariana Islands. On November 22, the vessel barely got through a heavy squall, that crushed the yal, that was lying on the sheep feed, into wood chips. At the same time, the main-staysail-sheet hit three sailors and threw them overboard. However, a shaft of water brought them back, and they were able to cling to the guys. The water level in the hold exceeded afoot, so the crew had to pump it out urgently. That exhausted people who were sleep and food-deprived for the whole day. On November 23, while cleaning the ship, the crew discovered the stench from the main hold. The next day they opened it and first put vitriole checkers in there, and sprinkled it with vitriol. Then the crew picked up the soaked bales with furs, while braziers heated the damp hold. Lisyansky was afraid of miasms and transferred the crew to the officers' mess before the hold will be in order again. Korobitsyn dismantled the bellows and assessed the damage from November 24 to 28. As a result, spoiled furs in the total cost of 80 000 rubles were thrown into the sea. After the incident, Korobitsyn conducted the report.

From Canton to Kronstadt (November 1805 – August 1806)

The stay in China

Due to mists and snow, on October 9, Nadezhda almost ran aground while leaving the Avacha Bay. The constant swell, cold and storms complicated the further way. Yet, Krusenstern risked searching for islands that were present on old Dutch and Spanish maps, such as Rico de la Plata, Guadeloupe, Malabrigos, and others. All of these islands were later declared nonexistent. The weather had become more or less clear only on the 20th day in the sea. However, on November 17, when the sloop was passing the Taiwan Strait, there was a hard stormy night. The captain ordered to keep the sails safe by all means; however, the old ones were tearing apart with every strong gust of wind. Thus, the new sails had to be installed. During the transition to Macau, the vessel anchored around 7 pm on November 20 when it was already very dark. As a result, the British almost captured the ship as they mistook it for Spanish. The reason for that was that Nadezhda went under the new nine-line commercial flag.

Krusenstern wanted to work with the director of the British East India Company's trading post in Guangzhou, J. Drummond, whom he had known since 1798. Following the instructions of count Rumyantsev, the captain aimed to receive from him detailed information on the Qing dynasty. By that time, the trade season had already opened, and British personnel went to Guangzhou, while the personal house of the director and the premises of the company were provided to Krusenstern and officers who wanted to scatter ashore. It turned out right away that the presence of Nadezhda in the bay broke many rules regarding the stay of foreign ships in China. Krusenstern was also concerned with the fact that the Neva had not shown up yet. On December 3, Lisyansky eventually arrived, and the Russian sloops relocated to the island Huangpu island to the mouth of the Pearl river (to which officers and merchants referred to as "Tigris"). Krusenstern, according to the instructions, hoped that the Yury Golovkin 's embassy was already in Beijing, and all agreements with the Qing authorities would be implemented. In reality, the embassy had not even crossed the Chinese border, and Russian sloops caused a commotion among the Guangdong authorities and merchants. Nevertheless, manager of maritime customs (the Russians called him goppo), Yan Feng allowed him to enter the port of Canton, apparently intending to charge duty. On the contrary, Governor Wu Xionguan hesitated with granting the permission, and without it, merchants could not make deals. At the same time, the typhoon season had started, and Krusenstern and Lisyansky risked to lose another year. In this situation, the British helped, especially the firm Bil' and Moniak (in Krusenstern's transcription). However, the RAC's clerk Shemelin was angry at the requested amount of commission – 5%, instead of the generally accepted 2%. Merchant barely was able to persuade the youngest member of the community Gunhan Li Yanyu (the Russians called him "Lukva") to "thank" Yan Feng. When the case moved forward, Shemelin did not want to engage in barter exchanges, but demanded cash in silver (possibly fulfilling the requirements of his company).

Generally, the deal did not bring the expected profit. According to Korobitsyn, they managed to sell furs in the amount of 191 621½ Spanish piastres, for which tea was obtained for 80,000, silk fabrics for 20,000, porcelain for 14,000 and pearls for 3,000 piastres. In case they received 74 631½ piastres, however, from them they paid commission to British, taxes, measurement tax, supplies for ministers, as well as expenses of two captains, two clerks and their servants on the shore. Krusenstern settled in the Austrian trading post (costing 800 piastres), and Lisyansky in the Armenian one (600 piastres). Shemelin claimed that for the cargo they received only 176 605 piastres. The situation was extremely unfavourable, and it was decided to bring the best fur of sea otters, foxes, arctic foxes and bears back to St. Petersburg. For the most valuable beaver skins, Chinese side gave no more than 20 piastres (100 rubles), although in Moscow they could be sold for 200-300 rubles. Probably, Krusenstern did not get into much details regarding the deal, considering it only as an annoying hindrance to his main cause. Generally, the common cargo consisted of 832 boxes of different tea sorts and 20 000 pieces of silk fabric on Nadezhda, as well as 1201 boxes of tea and unsold stocks from Alaska (355 sea otters, 2202 foxes, 1867 arctic foxes, 233 bears, 76 pounds of walrus bone) on Neva. Lisyansky used the delays in the departure to careene the Neva, and to repair the underwater skin and keel. All the repair works were carried out between December 27 and 29, 1805. A conflict between Krusenstern and Lisyansky erupted in January. As far as one can judge, Lisyansky sought to participate in the transaction and receive a captain's commission, referring to his status and the Maritime Charter.

The stay of the Russian sloops in Canton almost led to a political crisis. On January 22, 1806, the governor had ordered to stop the loading of Chinese goods until he received an official response from Beijing on the arrival of the Russian ships. He even set up the guards around the sloops. Director Drummond entered the position of both Kruzenshtern and Lisyansky and contacted the goppo through Lee Yanyu. As a result, the guard was removed. He even wrote a short letter to the governor with a request to release the sloops from China. Despite all the difficulties, the decisiveness of the British and Russian side took effect: the goppo personally visited Nadezhda and met with Lisyansky (Krusenstern was absent) – a rare case in relations between Chinese officials and foreign merchants. It seems that the governor and the customs authorities sought to get rid of the Russians as quickly as possible, so the exit documents were completed in just two days. On February 9, both sloops left Guangzhou. Already after the departure of Nadezhda and Neva Jiaqing Emperor annulled all the deals, and ordered to detent the ships. The emperor's order stated that marine trade with Russia would only damage the border trade in Kyakhta. Drummond tried to resend the copy of this order to the Russian authorities; he also sent view on the situation to Nikolay Novosiltsev.

At that time, the political situation between France and Russia was uncertain – many expected the war to start. For this reason, after leaving Huangpu, Krusenstern ordered to keep the vessels together and not to apart. In case if bad weather parted the sloops, both vessels would meet at the Saint Helena island which played the role of a rendezvous point. However, ships should not wait longer than four days.

Return of the Neva
Joint travelling of Nadezhda and Neva lasted until April 15, 1806. While leaving the Sunda Strait on March 5, sailor Stepan Konoplev died from the gastric disease that "turned him into a mummy". He was buried following the maritime tradition. On April 15, according to both Lisyansky and Korobitsyn, due to a "gloomy weather", the vessels parted. After that the commander of the Neva went under all sails to the Cape of Good Hope, wishing at all costs to return first. The vessel passed the Southern part of Africa at 3 pm on April 20, and on 24th it entered the zone of favorable southeast trade winds. Important events happened later this day. After counting food supplies, Lisyansky decided not to wait for Krusenstern at the Saint Helena, but to return to Saint Petersburg by his own as the provision should be enough for the three months travel. To successfully return, Lisyansky sacrificed part of his estate privileges. For instance, officers on the Neva ate fresh meat, while the lower ranks ate salted beef. Thus, only 20 chickens were left for the messes, and the crew was assigned with a new ration. Since there were no fresh herbs left, tea leaves were added to a corned beef soup. On Sundays and Thursdays the crew relied on rice porridge with molasses. On Mondays and Wednesdays – pickles or pickled vegetables. On Tuesdays and Fridays rice porridge was cooked on a "dried broth". The norm of the water consumption was 112 buckets (approximately 12 litres) per week. At the same time, there was an English beer essence that provided a "healthy and pleasant drink".

On April 26, a large conflict in the mess took place. Senior assistant lieutenant P.V. Povalishin sharply objected against the plans of the commander, which is recorded in the journal of the navigator Kalinin. He said it literally: "What, do you want to kill us by hunger?" and on that he received an answer "If I hear one more rude word, I will order to send you back to cabin". Nevertheless, in order to be able to collect rainwater and, if needed, get help from the shore, the route back to St. Petersburg was laid along the meridian of the Cape Verde Islands, and then the Azores. On June 9, near with the Corvo Island the vessel met the English military ship that delivered the news about the beginning of War of the Fourth Coalition between France and Russia. Even though Neva obtained all the necessary security certificates from the French government, the crew made all the arrangements to prepare for a potential fight. Finally, on June 26, the vessel reached the English Channel, and the met pilot bot led the sloop to Portsmouth for 50 Guineas. This record transition lasted 140 days, and was unprecedented for its time; there were no scurvy patients on board. The stay in Portsmouth lasted two weeks (June 28 – July 13), and Lisyansky even visited London from there. From the Downs to Skagen Neva went with the squadron of Lord Keith; the Russian ambassador obtained permission. On July 21 sailor Ivan Gorbunov died – he was previously injured in the chest during the Russo-Swedish War (1788–1790). At the last day of sailing on August 5, with fair wind the Neva showed a record speed in 11 knots which was approximately 20, 37 kilometres per hour, and in the morning of August 6 it anchored in Kronstadt.

Lisyansky was on the road for almost three years (1095 days). Altogether, he passed 45 083 marine miles (83 493 kilometres) for 532 days in the sea. 58.5 % of time and 57.2 % of the covered distance, Lisyansky acted independently. In the evening of August 6, the clerk Korobitsyn reported at the general meeting of shareholders of the Russian-American company. The next morning the directorate arrived on the Neva. On August 7, count Rumyantsev and count Stroganov also visited the vessel. On August 8, the emperor visited the sloop and had breakfast there, appreciating the quality of the sailors' food that was offered to him. On August 10, the sloop was visited by Empress and the four great princes on a boat from Peterhof. On September 5, Alexander I additionally examined the goods that were brought from China and already removed from the holds. On September 9, the auction of Chinese tea took place, where all the goods from both sloops (2095 boxes) were sold to Moscow merchants for 110 rubles per pood. On September 20, clerk Korobitsyn received , and eventually said goodbye to the sloop and its team. Captain lieutenant Lisyansky was promoted to Captain of the second rank, received Order of Saint Vladimir 3rd degree, a life pension, and a bonus of 3,000 rubles in silver. From the RAC he was awarded a prize of 10,000 rubles. The team presented its captain the golden sword "Gratitude of the Nevas crew".

Return of the Nadezhda 

Transition through the South China Sea in the typhoon season was quite dangerous. On March 1, the island Krakatoa got visible, and the crew discovered a safe passage nearby. Leaving the Sunda Strait, the sloop Nadezhda was able to cope with the current that carried it to the reefs only because of a rising wind. The sloop reached the Indian Ocean on March 3. During the massive storm on March 11, the topmast on the Neva was damaged, while a jibboom got cracked on the Nadezhda. On April 2, when sloops passed the meridian of St. Petersburg, lieutenant Petr Golovachev tried to commit suicide, but, for some reason, missed a shot. Doctor Espenberg was the first one who reacted to the sound of a shot and on the smell of gunpowder. On April 15 Nadezhda parted with Neva, and, besides, Krusenstern realized that it was a conscious decision of Lisyansky to take another course. In four days Krusenstern rounded the Cape of Good Hope, and on May 3 he arrived in the Saint Helena island, transitioning from Macau in 79 days.

Lieutenant Levenstern was the first who went ashore, bringing with him the news about the war between Russia and France. In the morning on May 4, Ratmanov and Krusenstern were going to visit the shore, and Golovachev was on duty and "as usual and with a cheerful look" reported to them. At 10 am, Tilesius also left the sloop and said to the commander and the first assistant that 29-year-old Golovachev committed suicide. According to the diaries of Levenstern, he shoot himself in the face and badly disfigured it. According to Ratmanov and Levenstern, while being on the Marquesas Islands, Golovachev took the Rezanov's side and was counting on a career in the RAC. However, as a result, he quarrelled with the officers who saw in him the ambassador's henchman. Probably, he thought about a suicide while being in China, because he made presents with his monogram for many officers. Before his last act, he left accusatory letters to Krusenstern, Tilesius and Romberg, and enclosed a letter to the emperor in a packet with a message to Krusenstern. Levenstern described in his diary the content of the letters to his colleagues. After Nadezhda returned to St. Petersburg, Alexander I ordered to burn the Golovachev's letter without opening, and not to conduct any investigations. Governor of the island Robert Patton said to Krusenstern that person who experienced melancholia could not be considered as a suicidal. Thus, the Anglican priest buried Golovachev with military honours, leaving the Latin epitaph composed by Espenberg on the tombstone.

It was impossible to get any proviant on Saint Helena because all flour products almost entirely went to the English squadron, and all the other products were costly. For instance, three guineas were asked for a ram, a bag of potatoes in two and a half pounds cost one guinea, chicken or duck – half of a guinea, 20 eggs – piastre, etc. As a result, upon to arrival in Copenhagen, the crew had to use only their stocks. After finding out about the war with France, Krusenstern regretted Lisyansky's self-will; besides, some of the guns were left in Kamchatka, and the English garrison could not offer a replacement for Russian ammunition. Thus, having only 12 guns on board, Krusenstern decided to round Scotland in the North Sea through the Orkney islands. At noon on May 8, the sloop Nadezhda left Jamestown. For the fourth and last time, the vessel crossed the Equator on May 21 in the Saint Nicholas day, being at 22° West longitude. On July 17, the ship passed between the islands of Fair Isle and Mainland of the Shetland islands, and on July 21 got closer to the Norwegian shores. On the island of Fair the crew managed to buy fresh fish, eggs and lamb. On July 23, the ship came across the English frigate Quebec, where for the first time Krusenstern received information about Lisyansky, who had left Portsmouth a week before and was being escorted by an English squadron. Nadezhda arrived in Copenhagen at 10 am on August 2. Sailing from China lasted five months 24 days, minus the 4-day stay at the Saint Helena island when only a small part of the crew went ashore. The captain reported the absence of scurvy patients on board. The ship anchored in Kronstadt on August 19, being absent for 3 years and 12 days.

On August 21-22 admiral Pavel Chichagov and count Rumyantsev visited the ship. On August 27 Krusenstern was invited to the Kamenny Island Palace. During the audience, the empress mother Maria Feodorovna granted the captain a diamond snuffbox as a sign of the highest favour. On August 30 Alexander I visited the Nadezhda and was on the board until 3 pm. All officers were granted with ranks and pensions. Krusenstern was also awarded Saint Vladimir order 3rd rank and was elected an honorary member of the Academy of Sciences. Sailors of both the Neva and Nadezhda received a retirement with a pension of 50 rubles per year.

Results and commemoration

Geographic discoveries
Crews on Nadezhda and Neva made several discoveries in the Pacific, closing the last undiscovered areas in its Northern part. Lisyansky, together with the Nevas navigator Dmitry Kalinin described the Kodiak Island in the Gulf of Alaska, and also the part of the Alexander Archipelago. Wherein west of the Sitka island Kalinin discovered the Kruzof Island, that was previously considered as an archipelago. Lisyansky named a large island to the North of Sitka as the Chichagof Island. On the way from Kodiak to Macau, they discovered an inhabitant Lisianski Island and Neva reef, belonging to the Hawaiian islands.

On the way from Japan to Kamchatka, Krusenstern went through the Tsushima Strait to the Sea of Japan, and depicted the Western coast of Hokkaido. They discovered a small Gulf of Patience. Given names are still present even in contemporary maps, for instance, capes of Senyavin and Soymonov. While transitioning through the Greater Kuril Chain, Krusenstern discovered four "Lovushki" islands. Then, while passing the Nadezhda Strait, the Krusenstern's crew reached the Cape Patience where it started shooting the way to Cape Levenstern, overall, 900 kilometres. Then they discovered the Northern Strait, the capes at the entrance and at the exit of which received names "Elizabeth" and "Maria" correspondingly. Near with the Northern access to the Amur Liman, the water depth was not significant, and Krusenstern concluded that Sakhalin was a peninsula. Participants of the first Russian circumnavigation conducted different oceanographic observations. They discovered the Equatorial Counter Current in Atlantic and the Pacific, measured the temperature difference at depths up to 400 m and determined its specific gravity, clarity and colour. They also found the reason behind the Milky seas effect and collected numerous data on atmospheric pressure, and tides in several areas of the oceans.

Publishing the results of the expedition

The Krusenstern's expedition aroused great interest both in Russia and in Europe that lasted several decades. Conducted ethnographic collection was first put in the Museum of the Admiralty Department. After the assortment, the collection was sent to Kunstkamera. The collection included goods from the Easter island, Marquesas and Hawaiian archipelagos. Illustrations easily attributed all items. The expedition's works were widely replicated: at public expense in 1809–1812 on both the Russian and German languages were published the Krusenstern's three-volume Journey Around the World (1310 pages) with an atlas. Atlas included 32 landscapes of the islands that the expedition visited; 44 ethnic types (Polynesians, Japanese, Chinese, Ainu, Kamchadals, Aleuts, Nivkhs); maps of the islands and shores. In 1913 Krusenstern's book was translated to English, and then to French, Italian, Dutch, Swedish, Danish. Lisyansky's description of the events was published in 1812 on his own money (18 500 rubles) with illustrations and carefully compiled maps. This book interested the West, in 1814 it was published in London in the Lisyansky's translation which was quite different from the Russian version. Langsdorf's description was published in 1812–1814 in German and English but was not translated to Russian. Diaries and notes of the crews are also available. Korobitsyn' notes were fully published only in 1944 after 50 years notes of Hieromonk Gideon were published, which provide important information on the ethnography of Alaska. In the years 1816-1818 and 1822–1825, the official reports made by Rezanov and Shemelin were published that described in many details the way how negotiations in Japan went. In 1820 S. Pryor published in London a description of all the circumnavigations made by then, in which Krusenstern's expedition was put in the same line with the Magellan's. Upon to the 1950s, Krusenstern's description was not reprinted in the Russian language. The last edition was abridged: from the third (scientific) part, only notes of Kamchadal and Marquise music (performed by Tilesius) and a letter from Commerce Minister Count Rumyantsev were left. By the 200th anniversary of the end of the expedition in 2007, the third edition re-released the 1950s variant. The second edition by Lisyansky was published in 1947 by the publishing house Geografiz. However, it was also abridged – all the detailed descriptions of astronomical and navigational characteristics, price lists for products and goods, were removed. In 1977 this edition was re-published in Vladivostok by the Far Eastern Book Publishing House. Geografgizs edition formed the basis of the third edition of 2007, released on the anniversary of the expedition. The richly illustrated volumes of the travels of Krusenstern and Lisyansky were also published in the series "The Great Travels" of the publishing house Eksmo.

Despite the abundance of published materials, by the end of the 20th century, some of the unpublished diaries, journals and illustrations were stored in the archives. For instance: the journal conducted by the Nevas navigator Dmitry Kalinin, notes by Tilesius, manuscript by counterman Shemelin. In 2003 the previously unpublished Levenstern's diary came out in both Russian and English languages. Tamara Shafranovskaya did the Russian translation. In 2005 the album Around the world with Krusenstern (edited by O. Fedorova and A. Krusenstern), in the basis of which lied Atlas with drawings of Tilesius, which was supplemented with botanic illustrations made by Langsdorf, and also previously unpublished pictures from Tilesius and Levenstern' archives. Besides a comprehensive foreword and appendixes, the text included a full chronicle of the events that we're representing a systematic selection of diaries of those participating in the expedition. In 2015 the same team of authors published all the Ratmanov's journals with extensive commentaries. For the first, watercolour paintings made by astronomer Horner and naturalist Langsdorf were published.

Commemoration 

According to E. Govor, Soviet and contemporary Russian historiography interpret Russian expeditions in the context of Imperial history. All achievements, including those of Lisyansky and Krusenstern, were studied from the position of impact to geographic discoveries, natural history and ethnography. In Soviet times, it was supplemented with anti-colonial propaganda in the framework of which many actions made by commanders and crews, including the foreign ones, were silenced. Nevertheless, starting from the 1980s, the first Russian circumnavigation has become a new object for a new historical reflection. First of all, it related to its representation in a four-volume monograph by Glen Barath, published in 1988–1992. In Russia, scientists  (in the context of a more broad scope of studies on Russian America), O. Fedorova and T. Shafranovskaya. E. Govor claims that published and commented sources create a significant base for further research on the subject. In 2010 Govor published a complex monograph Twelve days on Nuku Khiva that received many positive reviews from other specialists. Honorary polar explorer L. M. Sverdlov dedicated several publications to the relationship between Rezanov and Krusenstern. After he discovered new documents in the  related to conflict between the captain and chamberlain, Sverdlov published two monographs in 2006 and 2016 correspondingly.

Krusenstern and Lisyansky's expedition became a subject of artistic reflection in children's literature. In 1930  published the novel Ivan Krusenstern and Yuri Lisyansky – first Russian captains that rounded the world, that in 1941 was included in the book Frigate Drivers. Events and characters of the first Russian circumnavigation lie in the core of the adventure novel Islands and captains by Vladislav Krapivin (1984–1987). Phrase from the cartoon  "Ivan Fedorovich Krusenstern – a person and a steamboat" became an aphorism. At the same time, in the context of the cartoon, none of the main characters knew who were they talking about.

In 1993 the Central Bank of Russia released a series of commemorative coins of Russia dedicated to the first Russian circumnavigation. Russia, Estonia, Ukraine and Saint Helena island released postmarks dedicated to Krusenstern and the first Russian circumnavigation. In December 2013 the 4-episode documentary series  Neva and Nadezhda: The first Russian circumnavigation, directed by Russian journalist Mikhail Kozhukhov, were released on the state channel Russia-1.

Notable crew

 Adam Johann von Krusenstern, leader of the expedition and Captain of Nadezhda. Later Russian Admiral.
 Yuri Lisyansky, Captain of Neva. Won the Battle of Sitka against Tlingit during the journey.
 Nikolai Rezanov, appointed ambassador to Japan, co-led the expedition with Krusenstern until Kamchatka. One of the founders of Russian-American Company in 1799, was made an inspector of Russian colonies in America after the embassy failed; protagonist of the rock opera Juno and Avos.
 Fabian Gottlieb von Bellingshausen, lieutenant and cartographer. Published a collection of maps of Pacific following the journey. Later discovered the continent of Antarctica and a number of Pacific islands during his own circumnavigation and became Russian Admiral.
 Otto von Kotzebue, cabin boy. Later captained two circumnavigations, discovered over 400 Pacific islands and the Kotzebue Sound on Alaska.
 Fyodor Ivanovich Tolstoy, count, mischief-making participant. Acquired a fame of celebrity adventurer and nickname the American, became a prototype for Zaretsky in Pushkin's Eugene Onegin.
 Grigory Langsdorff, naturalist and physician. Later became the most renowned of Russian explorers of Brazil and South America.
 Wilhelm Gottlieb Tilesius von Tilenau, ship's doctor, marine biologist and expedition artist. His illustrated report on the expedition appeared in 1814. Also known for the reconstruction of the Adams mammoth skeleton.

See also
 Mulovsky expedition
 List of circumnavigations
 List of Russian explorers
 Second Russian circumnavigation (1966)

Notes

References

Citations

Sources 

Circumnavigations
Russian explorers
Russian Empire
Global expeditions
Expeditions from Russia